John Hajnal FBA (born  Hajnal-Kónyi, ; 26 November 1924 – 30 November 2008), was a Hungarian-British academic in the fields of mathematics and economics (statistics).

Hajnal is best known for identifying, in a landmark 1965 paper, the historical pattern of marriage of northwest Europe in which people married late and many adults remained single. The geographical boundary of this unusual marriage pattern is now known as the Hajnal line.

Biography

Hajnal was born in Darmstadt, at the time the capital of the People's State of Hesse in Weimar Germany, to a Hungarian Jewish family. In 1936 his parents left Nazi Germany, and placed him in a Quaker school in the Dutch countryside while they arranged to settle in Britain. In 1937, John was reunited with his parents in London, where he attended University College School, Hampstead.

At age 16, he entered Balliol College, Oxford. He gained a first there in economics, philosophy and politics in 1943. His skills in academic-level mathematics were mostly autodidactical.

After the war, Hajnal worked on demography for the   United Nations in New York, and later for the Office of Population Research, Princeton University.

He met Berlin-born Nina Lande in New York. They were married from 1950 until her death in 2008 and had three daughters and a son.

Returning to the United Kingdom, he worked at Manchester University as a statistician from 1953. The family moved to London in 1956, when John was assured a lectureship at the London School of Economics. He was Professor of Statistics at the London School of Economics from 1975 until his retirement in 1986.

Career

 Royal Commission on Population, 1944–48
 United Nations, New York, 1948–51
 Office of Population Research, Princeton University, 1951–53
 Manchester University, 1953–57
 London School of Economics, 1957–86. Reader, 1966–75, Professor of Statistics 1975–1986
 Visiting Fellow Commoner, Trinity College, Cambridge, 1974–75
 Visiting Professor, Rockefeller University, 1981

He was a member of the International Statistical Institute and was elected FBA in 1966.

References

 Who's Who (2006)
 The Palgrave Dictionary of Anglo-Jewish History, ed. W.  D. Rubinstein, Palgrave Macmillan, 2011, p. 387.
 Obituary,  The Jewish Chronicle, 5 February 2009.

1924 births
Academics of the London School of Economics
Academics of the Victoria University of Manchester
Alumni of Balliol College, Oxford
British Jews
20th-century British mathematicians
21st-century British mathematicians
British statisticians
Hungarian statisticians
Fellows of the British Academy
People educated at University College School
2008 deaths
Elected Members of the International Statistical Institute
German emigrants to the United Kingdom
Demographers